Nyāyāvatāra (also called Dvatrimsika) was composed in fifth century CE.

Author
It was written by Siddhasena in fifth century CE.

Notes

Sources
 

Jain texts